Abacetus chalceus is a species of ground beetle in the subfamily Pterostichinae. It was described by Maximilien Chaudoir in 1869.

References

chalceus
Beetles described in 1869